Descent Into Chaos is the fifth studio album by the Dutch Metal band, Legion of the Damned, released on January 7, 2011, through Massacre Records.

Track listing

Personnel 
 Maurice Swinkels - Vocals
 Richard Ebisch - Guitars
 Harold Gielen - Bass
 Erik Fleuren - Drums

References 

2011 albums
Legion of the Damned (band) albums
Massacre Records albums
Albums produced by Peter Tägtgren